Boston Aztec was an American soccer team based in Boston, Massachusetts, United States. Founded in 2006, the team played in the National Premier Soccer League (NPSL), a national amateur league at the fourth tier of the American Soccer Pyramid, in the Eastern Atlantic Division.

The team played its home games at Amesbury Sports Park in nearby Amesbury, Massachusetts in its final season, 2009. The team's colors were red and black.

The team was operated by the Aztec Soccer Club, which also operates a Women's Premier Soccer League team called Boston Aztec.

History

Players

Final roster
as at June 7, 2009

Notable former players

Year-by-year

Honors
 NPSL Atlantic Division Champions 2009

Head coaches
  Jeff Winterton, Mike Kersker (2007–present)

Stadia
 Cushing Field at University of Massachusetts Lowell; Lowell, Massachusetts (2007–2008)
 Amesbury Sports Park; Amesbury, Massachusetts (2009)

External links
Aztec Soccer
NPSL

2006 establishments in Massachusetts
2009 disestablishments in Massachusetts
Amesbury, Massachusetts
Association football clubs disestablished in 2009
Association football clubs established in 2006
Aztec Soccer Club
National Premier Soccer League teams
Soccer clubs in Massachusetts
Sports in Essex County, Massachusetts
Sports teams in Lowell, Massachusetts